Heather Kristin Gerken (born ) is an American legal scholar who serves as the Dean and Sol & Lillian Goldman Professor of Law at Yale Law School, where she teaches election law and runs the San Francisco Affirmative Litigation Project.

Biography

Early life and education 
Gerken grew up in Bolton, Massachusetts. Gerken graduated summa cum laude from Princeton University with an A.B. in history in 1991 after completing a 123-page long senior thesis titled "Stepping Out of the Bounds of Womanhood: An Analysis of the Popular Image of Women and Women's Experiences during World War II". In 1994, she graduated from the University of Michigan Law School, summa cum laude, and Order of the Coif, where she served as editor-in-chief of the Michigan Law Review.

She clerked for Judge Stephen R. Reinhardt of the U.S. Court of Appeals for the Ninth Circuit, and then for Justice David Souter of the U.S. Supreme Court during the 1995 Term.

Legal career 
She was an associate at Jenner & Block in Washington, D.C., from December 1996 to July 2000. From July 2000 to June 2006, she was a professor at Harvard Law School, where she was also a fellow at the Harvard University Center for Ethics and the Profession from September 2003 to July 2004. In 2006 Gerken joined Yale Law School and in 2008 she became the inaugural J. Skelly Wright Professor of Law. In 2009, in her book The Democracy Index (Princeton University Press), she proposed an index that would rate and compare the performance of elections systems at the state and local levels, to evaluate and improve the U.S. elections system. She became dean of Yale Law School in 2017, and in the same year she was elected a Fellow of the American Academy of Arts and Sciences. In 2021, she was named to the Presidential Commission on the Supreme Court of the United States, created by President Joe Biden in order to "provide an analysis of the principal arguments in the contemporary public debate for and against Supreme Court reform" in the context of evaluating the history and future of the court and its practices.

In January 2022, Yale University President Peter Salovey announced that Gerken had been reappointed as Dean of Yale Law School for a second five-year term.

Personal life
Gerken is married to David Simon.

Bibliography
 The Democracy Index: Why Our Election System is Failing and How to Fix It (Princeton University Press 2009) 
 "Slipping the Bonds of Federalism", 128 Harvard Law Review 85 (2014)
 "The Political Safeguards of Horizontal Federalism", 113 Michigan Law Review 57 (2014) (with Ari Holtzblatt)
 "The Real Problem with Citizens United: Campaign Finance, Dark Money, and Shadow Parties", 97 Marquette Law Review 904 (2014)
 "Uncooperative Federalism", 118 Yale Law Journal 1256 (2009) (with Jessica Bulman-Pozen)

See also 
 List of law clerks of the Supreme Court of the United States (Seat 3)

References

External links
 Appearances on C-Span.org
 Bio, Yale Law School

1969 births
American lawyers
American legal scholars
American legal writers
American women academics
Deans of Yale Law School
Fellows of the American Academy of Arts and Sciences
Harvard Law School faculty
Law clerks of the Supreme Court of the United States
Living people
People associated with Jenner & Block
People from Bolton, Massachusetts
Princeton University alumni
University of Michigan Law School alumni
Women deans (academic)
Yale University faculty
20th-century American women lawyers
20th-century American lawyers
21st-century American women lawyers
21st-century American lawyers
21st-century American academics